Silver Grove is an unincorporated community in Jefferson County, West Virginia, United States. Silver Grove lies between the Harpers Ferry National Historical Park along the Shenandoah River and the Loudoun Heights of the Blue Ridge.

References

Unincorporated communities in Jefferson County, West Virginia
Unincorporated communities in West Virginia